Christian Tabó (born 23 November 1993) is a Uruguayan professional footballer who plays as a winger for Liga MX club Cruz Azul.

Career

Tabó started his professional career with Racing Club de Montevideo.

On 29 January 2015 he was loaned to Club Nacional, where he obtain the league title.

On June 25, Atlas officially announced the permanent transfer of the Uruguayan player. on Thursday November 24 Tabo made his first goal with Atlas in the first leg of the Apertura 2018 quarter finals against Monterrey

Honours
Cruz Azul
Supercopa de la Liga MX: 2022

References

External links

1993 births
Living people
Uruguayan footballers
Uruguayan expatriate footballers
Liga MX players
Uruguayan Primera División players
Racing Club de Montevideo players
Club Nacional de Football players
Atlas F.C. footballers
Club Puebla players
Expatriate footballers in Mexico
Association football forwards